Camila María Concepción (December 20, 1991 – February 19, 2020) was an American screenwriter and transgender rights activist.

Biography 
Concepción was born in California and grew up in Inland Empire and El Monte. She graduated from Yale University with a degree in English literature.

Concepción was an assistant writer for the 2020 Netflix comedy-drama original series Gentefied, helping write the ninth episode "Protest Tacos", directed by Andrew Ahn. She was also a staff writer on Netflix's 2019 zombie comedy-drama series Daybreak.

Concepción was an active Latina transgender rights activist. She took part in Jill Soloway's Time's Up 50/50 by 2020 Initiative, advocating for more diverse representation in the entertainment industry. In 2018 she spoke about transgender representation in the media at the United State of Women Summit.

She died by suicide on February 19, 2020.

References 

1991 births
2020 deaths
2020 suicides
American women television writers
Hispanic and Latino American writers
LGBT Hispanic and Latino American people
LGBT people from California
LGBT-related suicides
People from El Monte, California
Screenwriters from California
Suicides in California
Transgender women
Transgender rights activists
Yale University alumni
American transgender writers
American LGBT screenwriters
Transgender screenwriters
21st-century American LGBT people